This article details the Catalans Dragons Rugby League Football Club's 2018 season.

Fixtures and results

Pre-season friendlies

Super League fixtures

Super League Super 8's

Challenge Cup

Transfers

In

Out

References

External links
catalansdragons.com Catalans Dragons Website

 Catalans Dragons seasons
Super League XXIII by club
2018 in French rugby league